Kahramanmaraşspor is a Turkish professional football club based in Kahramanmaraş.

History 
Following the 2023 Turkey–Syria earthquake, the club withdrew from the 2022-23 TFF Third League.

League participations

 Süper Lig: 1988–89
 TFF First League: 1984–88, 1989–93, 1994–96, 2013–14
 TFF Second League: 1993–94, 1996–2008, 2009–10, 2012–13, 2014–2022
 TFF Third League: 2008–09, 2010–12, 2022-
 Amateur Leagues: 1969–84

Current squad

Former players
 Taylan Aydoğan

Former managers
Bayram Toysal
Orhan Şerit
Alaaddin Demirözü
Hüseyin Yenikan
Fuat Akyüz
Rahim Zafer
Faik Demir
Recep Aydemir
Mehmet Şahan
Turhan Sofuoğlu (also former manager of Fenerbahce SK)
Gheorghe 'Gigi' Multescu
Abdülkerim Durmaz
Erdal Alpaslan

References

External links
 Official website
 Kahramanmaraşspor on TFF.org

 
Football clubs in Turkey
Sport in Kahramanmaraş
Kahramanmaraş
Association football clubs established in 1969
1969 establishments in Turkey
Süper Lig clubs